Club Deportivo La Equidad Seguros, also known as La Equidad, is a professional Colombian football team based in Bogotá, that currently plays in the Categoría Primera A. They play their home games at the Metropolitano de Techo stadium.

History
La Equidad was founded in 1982 by its namesake company Seguros La Equidad, and immediately after its foundation it entered the Olaya Tournament, a traditional amateur football tournament in Bogotá. La Equidad's first appearance in the 1982–83 edition of the tournament was supported by Independiente Santa Fe, which handed over a manager and several players of their youth ranks to take part in the competition, which was ultimately won by them. In 1993, La Equidad was officially constituted as an amateur club and joined the Bogotá Football League (Liga de Fútbol de Bogotá), entering the Categoría Primera C as well as the different youth tournaments organized by the regional amateur football league.

In 2003, La Equidad turned into a professional club and changed its name to Club Deportivo La Equidad, joining DIMAYOR and entering the Colombian second tier competition Categoría Primera B. In their first participation in Primera B, they made it to the semi-finals after an eighth place finish in the regular season.

La Equidad earned promotion to Categoría Primera A by winning the Primera B tournament in 2006 with Alexis García as manager. The Aseguradores won both of the tournaments making up the 2006 Primera B season, clinching their promotion as well as the second tier championship on 4 November 2006 after a 1–1 draw with Centauros at the Estadio Manuel Calle Lombana in Villavicencio.

La Equidad played their first match in Primera A on 4 February 2007, losing to Atlético Nacional by a 4–3 score at the Estadio Alfonso López Pumarejo in Bogotá. They got their first victory in the top tier in the ninth round of the tournament, a 2–0 win over Real Cartagena on 25 March. Their 2007 Apertura campaign was poor, as they ended in last place with only two wins in 18 matches and were deemed as main candidates for relegation at the end of the season. However, their fortunes improved greatly in the Finalización tournament, in which they were able to top the table for several rounds and advanced to their first semi-final stage thanks to a second place in the first stage of the tournament, thus avoiding relegation in the process. In the semi-finals, the team managed by Alexis García won Group B ahead of Boyacá Chicó, Deportivo Pasto and favourites Deportes Tolima to face defending champions Atlético Nacional in the finals. The first leg, played at Estadio El Campín, was won by Atlético Nacional by a 3–0 score, whilst the second leg played at Estadio Atanasio Girardot in Medellín ended in a scoreless draw which confirmed La Equidad's first runner-up finish in the top flight.

In 2008, La Equidad won the Copa Colombia by beating Once Caldas over two legs in the final, and qualified for the 2009 Copa Sudamericana. Thanks to this title as well as its consistent performances since they were promoted to the top tier in 2007, La Equidad came to be among the top 100 football clubs in the world according to the rankings of the International Federation of Football History and Statistics (IFFHS) in 2009.

La Equidad made it to their second final series in the 2010 Apertura tournament, facing Junior. Although they won the first leg played in Bogotá 1–0 with a goal by Peruvian footballer Renzo Sheput, they were unable to hold on to this advantage and in the return leg in Barranquilla they capitulated by a 3–1 score with which Junior won the title and La Equidad had to settle for another runner-up finish. One year later, the Asegurador side once again advanced to the finals, facing Atlético Nacional for the 2011 Apertura title, just like in 2007. This time, the first leg was won by La Equidad by a 2–1 score, while Atlético Nacional were leading the second leg by a 2–0 score until a late goal by Roberto Polo helped La Equidad tie the aggregate score and drag the series to a penalty shoot-out which was won by the Verdolaga squad.

The consistent domestic performances of the Asegurador side allowed them to qualify for the Copa Sudamericana for three years in a row between 2011 and 2013. The latter one was La Equidad's first deep campaign in the competition, as they managed to advance to the round of 16 by knocking out Trujillanos from Venezuela and Cobreloa from Chile before losing to Argentine side Vélez Sarsfield. This performance was surpassed in 2019, in which the team advanced to the quarter-finals where they were knocked out by Atlético Mineiro.

Honours

Categoría Primera A:
Runners-up (3): 2007–II, 2010–I, 2011–I

Categoría Primera B:
Winners (1): 2006

Copa Colombia:
Winners (1): 2008

Performance in CONMEBOL competitions
Copa Sudamericana: 7 appearances
2009: First stage
2011: Second stage
2012: First stage
2013: Round of 16
2019: Quarter-finals
2021: Group stage
2022: First stage

Players

Current squad

Managers
 Fáber López (2003–05)
 Alexis García (July 1, 2006–Dec 31, 2012)
 Néstor Otero (Dec 27, 2012–14)
 Fáber López (2014)
 Santiago Escobar (2015–16)
 Arturo Boyacá (2016–2017)
 Luis Fernando Suárez (2017–2018)
 Humberto Sierra (2019)
 Luis Guillermo Rivera (2019)
 Alexis García (November, 2019–)

References

External links

Official website
Current squad and player statistics at Soccernet
La Equidad page on DIMAYOR.com

Football clubs in Colombia
Association football clubs established in 1982
1982 establishments in Colombia
Football clubs in Bogotá
Categoría Primera A clubs
Categoría Primera B clubs
Unrelegated association football clubs